Rancho Alamitos High School is in Garden Grove, California. It is a member of the Garden Grove Unified School District and serves north-central Garden Grove and a section of Stanton. The high school first opened in the spring of 1957 with no senior class. The first graduating class was in 1958.

History 
The school was named "Rancho Alamitos" (little cottonwoods ranch) in homage to the Rancho Los Alamitos landgrant and the Hispanic history in Orange County. The area of the Rancho Alamitos High School campus was originally part of the Rancho Los Alamitos landgrant, itself part of Rancho Los Nietos, a Spanish landgrant made in 1784. After John Bixby died in 1888, numerous sections of Rancho Los Alamitos were sold, and Lumis A. Evans, a real estate dealer, acquired the area. In the mid-1950s the Garden Grove Union High School District purchased forty acres of this land from the family of Mr. Evans. Construction of Rancho Alamitos High School began in 1956.

Rancho Alamitos High School was formulated for classes to start in the Fall of 1957; however, since the campus was not ready, their classes were taught for that first semester on the older Garden Grove High School campus. Although construction of the new campus was incomplete, in the Spring of 1957 the first classes at the Rancho Alamitos High School campus were held in two pre-existing homes on the property, ones that faced Dale Street. They continued to be used as classrooms until construction was completed in 1959. In the Spring of 1957, the Rancho Alamitos campus officially opened and the next Spring the first senior class graduated.

List of principals
 1956–1957 — Don Kennedy
 1957–1960 — Richard Bivin
 1960–1961 — Sam Chicas 
 1961–1964 — Vic McClain 
 1964–1966 — William Zogg 
 1966–1976 — Tracy Strong 
 1976–1982 — Ron Forsyth 
 1982–1985 — Jim DeLong 
 1985–1991 — Bob Mesa 
 1991–2000 — Tom Robins 
 2000–2006 — Gene Campbell
 2006–2009 — Frank Mackay 
 2009–present — Mary Jane Hibbard

Logo
The school colors are green and gold. Until the mid-1970s the school mascot had been "Poco", a cartoon character of a short male dressed in a large poncho with a serape, a Mexican–Indian throw blanket or rug over one shoulder and a large sombrero on his head, covering the eyes.
  
The school logo was changed to a cowboy boot spur because of racial controversy regarding the character of Poco. More recently, the school's crest or a big letter V with the word "Rancho" across it would be seen on most planners and/or merchandise.

Academics 
Based on the 2013 academic year, U.S News & World Report in its "The Best Schools in United States" ranked Rancho Alamitos High School as #367 (out of 2,199) among California schools, and #1718 (out of more than 21,000) in the nation. With that rank, it awarded RAHS the Silver Medal.

Sports
The school's athletic teams are known as the Vaqueros (a Spanish type of cowboy figure), though Rancho students tend to shorten its name to "Vaqs".

The athletic teams are part of California Interscholastic Federation's Southern Section, participating in the six-team Garden Grove League, mostly against other schools in the Garden Grove Unified School District.

Categories of Sports 
Sports at Rancho Alamitos High School have included:
 Baseball
 Basketball
 Cheerleading
 Color Guard
 Cross Country
 Football
 Soccer 
 Softball
 Swim
 Tennis
 Track and Field
 Volleyball
 Water Polo
Marching Band

Football 
1990s
The Vaquero football team had moderate success in the early to mid 1990s, led by a slew of talented running. The team made two straight Division VII Finals appearance. Falling just short in 1992 by a score of 14-13, to Sunny Hills High School. Running Back Leon Vickers was the Division VII player of the year for his performance. The following year they fell to Mira Costa 29 to 17. In 1996 and 1997 the Vaqs posted back to back undefeated regular seasons, only to lose to rival Pacifica in the Semi-finals ('96) and Northview in the Quarter Finals ('97). In 1996 Leo Kosi was the Division VIII MVP, while in 1997 David Vickers held the same honor.

Since 2000
The Vaqueros made a Finals appearance in 2014, only to lose to rival Garden Grove 35 to 0. On 16 October 2015, Garden Grove defeated Rancho Alamitos 34 to 3, with no points scored in the second half.

Notable alumni
 Richard Andrew Anderson (class of 1978) – NBA Basketball player.
 Patrick Burris (class of 1968) – Olympian judoka in 1972 and 1976, and Pan American Games bronze medalist in 1975.
 Gary Hall, Sr. (class of 1969) – Olympian swimmer in 1968, 1972 and 1976.
 Gary Hill (class of 1961) – played for the Minnesota Vikings in 1965.
 Gerald Laird (attended his freshman year, graduated from La Quinta High School ) – catcher for the St. Louis Cardinals.
 Danny Lockin – stage and film actor.
 Steve Martin (attended his freshman and sophomore years, graduated from Garden Grove High School in 1963) – comedian, writer, actor, musician and composer.
 Ray Martinez "DJ RayMar" (class of 1973) – American Disc Jockey Hall of Fame Inductee and author.
 Dennis Paepke (class of 1963) - MLB player for Kansas City Royals from 1969-1974
 Craig Paquette (class of 1987) – MLB third baseman from 1993–2003.
 Nam Phan (class of 2002) – MMA fighter.
 Curt Pringle (class of 1977) – former State Assemblyman, Speaker of the California State Assembly in 1996 and former mayor of Anaheim, California 2002-2010.
 Christi Robell – 1980 and 1984 Olympic gymnast and 1979 Junior National Gymnastics Champion.
 Jim Silva (class of 1962) – former State Assemblyman, former Member of the Orange County Board of Supervisors, former Mayor of Huntington Beach
 Nicole Brown Simpson (graduated from Dana Hills High School in 1977) – ex-wife of football star O. J. Simpson.
 Paul Soliai (attended his freshman, sophomore and junior years before moving to American Samoa) – defensive tackle For the Miami Dolphins and pro bowler.
 Shawn Stussy – founder of Stüssy
 Randy Vataha (class of 1967) – NFL wide receiver.

References

External links

Rancho Alamitos Alumni Association
Rancho Alamitos Class of 1960

High schools in Orange County, California
Education in Garden Grove, California
Public high schools in California
Educational institutions established in 1957
1957 establishments in California